Bunias is a genus of flowering plants in the cabbage family Brassicaceae. The genus includes only two accepted species, Bunias erucago (crested warty cabbage, corn rocket) and Bunias orientalis (Turkish rocket, hill mustard, Turkish warty cabbage, warty cabbage).

References

Brassicaceae
Brassicaceae genera